The Bacon County Elementary School, also referred to as Bacon County School, is a historic school in Alma, Georgia, located at 504 North Pierce Street (US Highway 1). It was built by Alexander Douglas and was constructed in 1933-1934. It is in the Colonial Revival style.  The school contains a two-story main block (containing offices) with a portico in the center with one-story wings for classrooms.  There is a large auditorium in the rear.

A junior high school and high school were constructed on the site in the 1940s.  A cafeteria was built in 1953 and two buildings for kindergarten and Head Start were built in 1969. The 1969 buildings remain, but are outside the National Register boundary.  The 1940s and 1953 buildings were demolished in 2003. It was added to the National Register of Historic Places on December 26, 2007.

See also
Bacon County High School
Bacon County School District
National Register of Historic Places listings in Bacon County, Georgia

References

School buildings on the National Register of Historic Places in Georgia (U.S. state)
Buildings and structures in Bacon County, Georgia
National Register of Historic Places in Bacon County, Georgia
School buildings completed in 1933
Colonial Revival architecture in Georgia (U.S. state)